This is a list of people who have served as Lord Lieutenant of Oxfordshire. Since 1689, all Lords Lieutenant have also been Custos Rotulorum of Oxfordshire.

Deputy lieutenants
A deputy lieutenant of Oxfordshire is commissioned by the Lord Lieutenant of Oxfordshire. Deputy lieutenants support the work of the lord-lieutenant. There can be several deputy lieutenants at any time, depending on the population of the county. Their appointment does not terminate with the changing of the lord-lieutenant, but they usually retire at age 75.

19th Century
28 February 1831: Colonel John William Fane
6 April 1831: Joseph Warner Henley, Esq., 
4 August 1852: Lord Alan Spencer-Churchill
4 August 1852: The Lord Camoys
4 August 1852: The Hon. Percy Barrington
4 August 1852: General Sir William Thomas Knollys, 
4 August 1852: Major George Hall
4 August 1852: Joseph Phillimore, Esq.
4 August 1852: Hugh Hamersley, Esq.
4 August 1852: George Henry Earnett, Esq.
4 August 1852: Henry Barnett, Esq.
4 August 1852: Richard Aubrey Cartwright, Esq.
4 August 1852: James Patrick Muirhead, Esq.
4 August 1852: William Barrington Reade, Esq.
4 August 1852: William Henry Stone, Esq.
4 August 1852: Frederick Whitaker, Esq.
4 August 1852: Henry Norris, Esq.
4 August 1852: Joseph John Henley, Esq., 
4 August 1852: Clement Cottrell Dormer, Esq.
4 August 1852: Henry Hall, Esq.
4 August 1852: Arthur Henry Clerke Brown, Esq.
4 August 1852: William Elias Taunton, Esq.
4 August 1852: William Earle Tyndale, Esq.
4 August 1852: Archer Robert Tawney, Esq.
4 August 1852: William Weinyss Methven Dewar, Esq.

References
 

Oxfordshire History

External links
 Lord Lieutenant of Oxfordshire

Local government in Oxfordshire
Oxfordshire